Marystaple (also known by its fans as Staple) is a New Zealand-based alternative rock band formed in 1996.



Band members
Matt Fairley (lead vocals, guitar)
Aaron McMinn (bass guitar)
Mike Enoka (drums)

History
After the release of their well received first EP Reset Speed in 2002, the band began the first of two nationwide tours around New Zealand. They played over 60 gigs (many of which sold out) and included gigs with The Datsuns, The D4, Superjesus, Grinspoon and Betchadupa. Two of their music videos reached M2's top 12 charts (with both of them staying on for over 2 months).

Discography

Albums

Tracks on various compilations

In the media

Television
"Labourer" was used in the season 1, episode 17 "Sex, Lies and Spacerocks" of The Gibson Group Ltd comedy/drama series The Strip.

References

External links
Marystaple's official website
Marystaple's myspace.com profile

New Zealand alternative rock groups
Musical groups established in 1996
1996 establishments in New Zealand